The fifth season of the television series Xena: Warrior Princess commenced airing in the United States and Canada on September 27, 1999, and concluded on May 15, 2000, and contained 22 episodes.

The fifth season aired in the United States on the USA Network. The season was released on DVD as a ten disc boxed set under the title of Xena: Warrior Princess: Season 5 on October 19, 2004, by Anchor Bay Entertainment.

The episode "Antony and Cleopatra" has been discussed as a reworking of Shakespeare's play of the same name.

Episodes

References

1999 American television seasons
2000 American television seasons
Xena: Warrior Princess seasons